Manpower is a 1941 American crime comedy drama film directed by Raoul Walsh and starring Edward G. Robinson, Marlene Dietrich, and George Raft. The picture was written by Richard Macauley and Jerry Wald, and the supporting cast features Alan Hale, Frank McHugh, Eve Arden, Barton MacLane, Ward Bond and Walter Catlett.

Robinson and Raft got into a fistfight on the set that was eagerly splashed all over the front pages of the nation's newspapers. Victor McLaglen was originally going to play Robinson's role, which would have made it a supporting part, and Raft reportedly resented sharing leading man status on the film as a result of Robinson being cast instead.

Raft chose Manpower over the remake of the 1931 pre-Code version of Dashiell Hammett's The Maltese Falcon, partly because it was a choice between untried first-time director John Huston and Walsh (the veteran director of Raft's 1933 hit The Bowery), plus Raft understandably reasoned that a Hays Code-era remake may not be able to live up to its pre-Code predecessor, so the career-catapulting role of Sam Spade went to Humphrey Bogart instead.

The script is one of many reworkings of the plotline for a 1932 Robinson movie called Tiger Shark, in which Robinson played essentially the same part, only as a tuna fisherman rather than an electric power lineman.

Plot
A leg injury causes Los Angeles power line worker Hank McHenry to give up field work and accept a promotion to foreman. His crew includes good friend Johnny Marshall and old Pop Duval.

Pop is killed during an ice storm. His daughter Fay's seeming indifference to the death irritates Johnny, but Hank is attracted to her. A hostess in a nightclub, Fay accepts money from Hank and also his marriage proposal, even though she does not love him.

Before a project that takes them to Boulder Dam, an injury befalls Johnny. He is taken into Hank's home to recuperate where, after a month together, Fay tells him she is attracted to him but Johnny resists her. Fay decides to leave Hank, but she is arrested in a raid while she is visiting her old club. Johnny pays her bail and stops her leaving Hank. However, she tells Hank that she is leaving him and is attracted to Johnny and a combination of circumstances means that Hank misconstrues the situation, believing Johnny has betrayed him.

In wet and windy weather, Hank climbs a pylon with his bad leg to attack Johnny, during which Hank falls to his death. Johnny is left to decide whether he is attracted to Fay or repelled by her; he makes his decision while Fay is waiting for the bus to leave town.

Cast

 Edward G. Robinson as Hank "Gimpy" McHenry
 Marlene Dietrich as Fay Duval
 George Raft as Johnny Marshall
 Alan Hale, Sr. as Jumbo Wells
 Frank McHugh as Omaha
 Eve Arden as Dolly
 Barton MacLane as Smiley Quinn
 Ward Bond as Eddie Adams
 Walter Catlett as Sidney Whipple
 Joyce Compton as Scarlett
 Lucia Carroll as Flo
 Egon Brecher as Pop Duval
 Cliff Clark as Cully
 Joseph Crehan as Sweeney
 Ben Welden as Al Hurst
 Barbara Pepper as Polly
 Dorothy Appleby as Wilma

Production
Mark Hellinger was meant to produce the film, but had a falling-out with Hal Wallis of Warner Bros.

Walsh was keen to make the film because he was getting a reputation as a "Man's" director and Marlene Dietrich had a lead role.

Production was marked by several conflicts between Raft and Robinson, mostly initiated by Raft. Robinson recalled Raft as "touchy, difficult and thoroughly impossible to play with."

Raft verbally abused Robinson and pushed him around the set. Raft later complained that Robinson tried to tell him how to act; he also felt the actor was miscast, preferring Victor McLaglen.  Raft resented having to accept third billing despite having the largest role in the film by a wide margin. Robinson and Raft appeared together again 14 years later for a B-movie film noir entitled A Bullet for Joey (1955), after both their careers had seriously declined.

Reception
Bosley Crowther wrote a positive review for the film, noting that the cast was outstanding: "With such exceptional material, the Warner blacksmiths couldn't help but make good—good, in this sense—meaning the accomplishment of a tough, fast, exciting adventure film."  Channel 4's review of the movie notes the exciting setting makes it worth seeing, but goes on to pan the film: "Directed with the usual efficiency by Walsh, Manpower's weak script never manages to convince despite the setting and the strong cast."

The film was a solid box office hit. According to Warner Bros records, it earned $1,180,000 domestically and $662,000 foreign.

References

External links 
 
 
 
 

1941 films
American crime drama films
American black-and-white films
1941 crime drama films
1940s English-language films
Film noir
Films directed by Raoul Walsh
Films scored by Adolph Deutsch
Warner Bros. films
1940s American films